Ginnen Upan Seethala (The Fire born frozen) is a 2019 Sinhala biographical film about Sri Lankan Marxist revolutionary Rohana Wijeweera directed by Anuruddha Jayasinghe and produced by Chamathka Peiris for Cinepro Lanka International. The film stars Kamal Addaraarachchi and Sulochana Weerasinghe in lead roles along with Jagath Manuwarna and Sujeewa Priyalal. Music composed by Nadeeka Guruge. It is the 1321st Sri Lankan film in the Sinhala cinema.

Plot
The film is the biopic of JVP leader Rohana Wijeweera and the JVP's trajectory from 1977 to 1989 with other JVP leaders who led the conflict with UNP government. The film begins with the release of Rohana Wijeweera and several others who were jailed for life in 1977. JVP became a banned political party in 1983. Since then, Wijeweera has gone into hiding. It revolves around Wijeweera's personal life, his secret meetings with JVP leaders, escapes from military and finally his and his allies capture. Wijeweera is able to marry a young girl named Chitrangani despite her objections. She also became the mother of five children during a period of terror. Then, Presidential election and referendum held in 1982, sabotage of JVP meetings by pro-government.

Cast
 Kamal Addaraarachchi as Rohana Wijeweera
 Sulochana Weerasinghe as Chithrangani Wijeweera
 Jagath Manuwarna as Upatissa Gamanayake
 Sujeewa Priyalal as Somawansa Amarasinghe
 Susan Niroshan as Saman Piyasiri Fernando
 Priyantha Sirikumara as Lionel Bopage
 Jehan Sri Kanth as Sisira Randeniya
 Thusitha Laknath as Piyadasa Ranasinghe
 Sanjeeva Upendra as Sumith Athukorale
 Dilhani Ekanayake as Doctor's Wife
 Vishwajith Gunasekara as Doctor Jayathilake 	
 Deepani Silva as Rohana Wijeweera's Mother 		
 Prasannajith Abesuriya as H. N. Fernando, Chithrangani's brother		
 Narada Thotagamuwa as D. M. Ananda
 Suraj Mapa as Vijitha Ranaweera 
 Harsha Thennakoon as Dr Chandra		
 Chandrasoma Binduhewa		
 Hansamala Janaki		
 Manjula Moragaha		
 Anjana Premarathna
 Chinthaka Kulathunga
 Buddhika Jayaratne

Production
The film is based on late Janatha Vimukthi Peramuna leader Rohana Wijeweera’s life, his comrades and political life until his death. Shooting took place in Ranminithenna Cinema Village, Haldummulla, Ulapane and locations around them. Filming started on 17 January 2017, where Addaraarachchi confirmed as the main protagonist role.

Accolade
The film is one of the two films that were submitted for awards at the 91st Academy Awards. The film was first screened on 3 July 2018 at the National Film Corporation of Sri Lanka.

Songs
The film consists of 2 songs.

References

External links
 

Sinhala-language films
Janatha Vimukthi Peramuna
Films about revolutionaries
Films set in Sri Lanka (1948–present)